Sevan Island ( Sevani kğzi), now Sevan Peninsula ( Sevani t'erakğzi), is a former island in the north-western part of Lake Sevan in Armenia.  After the artificial draining of Lake Sevan, which started in the Stalin era, the water level fell about 20 metres, and the island transformed into a peninsula. At the southern shore of this newly created peninsula, a guesthouse of the Armenian Writers' Union was built. The eastern shore is occupied by the Armenian president's summer residence, while the monastery's still active seminary moved to newly constructed buildings at the northern shore of the peninsula.

Sevan Island is home to a ninth-century Armenian Cathedral church, known as Sevanavank, which is one of the most visited tourist attractions in Armenia.

Gallery

Panorama

See also 
 Lake Sevan
 Sevanavank

References

 
 

Islands of Armenia
Landforms of Armenia
Geography of Gegharkunik Province
Peninsulas of Asia